Miguel Perez (born April 28, 2005) is an American soccer player who plays as a midfielder for Major League Soccer club St. Louis City SC.

Career

Youth
Perez was born in St. Louis, Missouri, and attends Pattonville High School. He played varsity soccer for his high school team and also joined several clubs associated with the Olympic Development Program. Perez was scouted by the St. Louis City SC academy in November 2020 and joined them the following year. In 2022, Perez made seven appearances for St. Louis City SC 2, the club's reserve and development team in MLS Next Pro.

St. Louis City
On February 21, 2023, Perez signed a three-year homegrown player deal with Major League Soccer's St. Louis City SC ahead of their inaugural season. He made his MLS debut on February 26, 2023, appearing as a 59th-minute substitute during a 3–2 win over Austin FC.

References

External links
 
 Player's Profile at MLS

American soccer players
2005 births
Living people
Association football midfielders
Sportspeople from St. Louis
Soccer players from Missouri
MLS Next Pro players
Major League Soccer players
St. Louis City SC 2 players
Homegrown Players (MLS)